Central Telegraph Office is a colonial-era landmark in Yangon, Myanmar (formerly Rangoon, Burma), designated in the Yangon City Heritage List. The building, located on the corner of Pansodan and Maha Bandula Roads, now houses the a government office, Myanma Posts and Telecommunications (MPT).

Central Telegraph Office was designed by John Begg, a government architect who had also designed other colonial era buildings in the city, including Custom House on Strand Road, and the Printing and Publishing Enterprise building. Construction for the four-story, steel-framed building, took place between 1913 and 1917, delivered by Clark & Greig. For a time, the building also housed the Burma Broadcasting Service.

References

External links

Government buildings in Myanmar
Buildings and structures in Yangon
Buildings and structures completed in 1917